Jasmin Imamović (born 8 October 1957) is a Bosnian writer and politician who is a member of the national House of Representatives. He previously served as the 31st mayor of Tuzla from 2001 to 2022.

Imamović is a member of the Social Democratic Party and holds a degree from the Faculty of Law at the University of Sarajevo.

Early life and education
Imamović was born in Brčko, FPR Yugoslavia, present-day Bosnia and Herzegovina, on 8 October 1957. He graduated from the Faculty of Law at the University of Sarajevo.

Political career
Imamović has been a member of the Social Democratic Party (SDP BiH) since 2000. He was elected mayor of Tuzla for the first time at the 2000 municipal elections, succeeding Selim Bešlagić in February 2001. He was then re-elected as mayor at the 2004, 2008, 2012, 2016 and the 2020 municipal elections.

Imamović was elected to the national House of Representatives at the 2022 general election, obtaining over 23,000 votes, the most amongst the SDP BiH candidates. Due to him becoming a member of Parliament, he was forced to resign as mayor of Tuzla.

Writing career
Acclaimed for his short stories and novels, Imamović has published three books, titled The killing of death, Immortal deer and The adorer of a moment (Obožavatelj trena, Oboževalec trenutka) which was the third best-selling book in Slovenia in 2004.

References

External links

Jasmin Imamović at imovinapoliticara.cin.ba

1957 births
Living people
People from Brčko District
Bosniaks of Bosnia and Herzegovina
Bosnia and Herzegovina writers
Bosnia and Herzegovina politicians
Sarajevo Law School alumni
Social Democratic Party of Bosnia and Herzegovina politicians
Mayors of Tuzla
Members of the House of Representatives (Bosnia and Herzegovina)